George Lafayette Richardson (November 9, 1843 – June 7, 1914) was an American politician who served in the Virginia House of Delegates.

References

External links 

1843 births
1914 deaths
Democratic Party members of the Virginia House of Delegates
20th-century American politicians